Democrația (Romanian for "Democracy") was a weekly newspaper from the Republic of Moldova, published between December 2001 and April 5, 2009. The editors in chief were Ala Mândâcanu (2001–2004)  and Cornel Ciurea (2006–2009). The weekly newspaper was close to the Social Liberal Party (Moldova), Cornel Ciurea was serving as a deputy president of the party.

References

External links 

2001 establishments in Moldova
2009 disestablishments in Moldova
Defunct newspapers published in Moldova
Mass media in Chișinău
Newspapers published in Moldova
Political newspapers
Publications established in 2001
Publications disestablished in 2009
Romanian-language newspapers published in Moldova